Slyudyansky District is an administrative district, one of the thirty-three in Irkutsk Oblast, Russia. Municipally, it is incorporated as Slyudyansky Municipal District. Its administrative center is the town of Slyudyanka. Population:  44,039 (2002 Census);

Administrative and municipal status
Within the framework of administrative divisions, Slyudyansky District is one of the thirty-three in the oblast. The town of Slyudyanka serves as its administrative center. As a municipal division, the district is incorporated as Slyudyansky Municipal District.

References

Notes

Sources

Districts of Irkutsk Oblast
